Madiot is a French surname. Notable people with the surname include:

Marc Madiot (born 1959), French cyclist
Yvon Madiot (born 1962), French cyclist, brother of Marc

French-language surnames